Kajari melon, also known as Delhi melon, is a honeydew cultivar originating in Punjab grown for its unique coloring.

Description
It weighs 2-3 pounds (0.9-1.3 kilograms) and its thin rind is red-orange in color with green vertical stripes, and the interior flesh is green, similar to a honeydew. It is round to slightly oblate in shape. It is able to grow in relatively short seasons and is hardy to several USDA zones, including zone 6. The flavor is said to be similar to honeydew but sweeter. It was introduced to the United States around 2014 by botanical explorer Joseph Simcox. However, other seed providers and individuals were growing either this melon or an identically named melon that seems identical in culture and appearance before that date in the U. S. A.

Availability
Seeds of the plant are available through several online sources.

See also
Muskmelon
Cucumis
Melon

References

Melons
Cucumis
Fruits originating in Asia
Edible fruits